"The Revolutionists Stop for Orangeade" is a poem from the second
edition (1931) of Wallace Stevens's first book of poetry,
Harmonium.

Although the poem's title is not atypical in being gaudy, it may be an
exception to the rule that the titles of Stevens's poems are not
guides to their content. The revolutionists are imploring
their leader to let them stop singing in the sun, or at least to
resume singing in the shade. And while the captain starts the singing
in a voice rougher than a grinding shale, orangeade all around would
not be amiss.

The poem reflects Stevens's affection for the Caribbean, and it is as
light as a feather compared to other poems added to the 1931 edition
of Harmonium, like "Sea Surface full of Clouds".

Direct address and imperative mood ("Ask us not....", "Sing a
song....", "Wear the breeches...", "Hang a feather....") keeps the
pace brisk in the poem's four stanzas, enhanced in the fourth by the
unusual rhyming.

References 

 Bates, Milton J. Wallace Stevens: A Mythology of Self. 1985: University of California Press.

1931 poems
American poems
Poetry by Wallace Stevens